Marseilleviridae is a family of viruses first named in 2012. The genomes of these viruses are double-stranded DNA. Amoeba are often hosts, but there is evidence that they are found in humans as well. The family contains one genus and four species, two of which are unassigned to a genus. It is a member of the nucleocytoplasmic large DNA viruses clade.

Taxonomy
The genus contains the following genera and species:
Marseillevirus
Marseillevirus marseillevirus
Senegalvirus marseillevirus
Species unassigned to a genus:
Lausannevirus
Tunisvirus

Related Viruses

Additional species have since been recognized. The first member of this family recognized has been named Acanthamoeba polyphaga marseillevirus. A second member is Acanthamoeba castellanii lausannevirus. Two additional viruses have been isolated but have yet to be named. Another member of this family has been isolated from blood donors. An isolate from insects—Insectomime virus—has also been reported.

The viruses appear to fall into at least 3 lineages: (1) Marseillevirus and Cannes8virus (2) Insectomime and Tunisvirus and (3) Lausannevirus. A sixth potential member of this family—Melbournevirus—appears to be related to the Marseillevirus/Cannes8virus clade.

A seventh virus—Brazilian Marseillevirus—has been reported. This virus appears to belong to a fourth lineage of virus in this family.

Another virus—Tokyovirus—has also been reported.

Another member of this family is Kurlavirus.

In 2017, it was proposed that the family contained the following five lineages:

Lineage A
 Cannes 8 virus 
 Marseillevirus marseillevirus
 Marseillevirus shanghai
 Melbournvirus
 Senegalvirus 
 Tokyovirus 

Lineage B
 Kurlavirus 
 Lausannevirus
 Noumeavirus
 Port-miou virus 

Lineage C
 Insectomime virus
 Tunisvirus
 
Lineage D
 Brazilian marseillevirus

Lineage E
 Golden marseillevirus

Another putative member of this family is Marseillevirus shanghai. If this virus is confirmed, it would belong to the A lineage.

Structure
Viruses in Marseilleviridae have icosahedral geometries. The diameter is around 250 nm. Genomes are circular, around 372kb in length. The genome has 457 open reading frames.

Life cycle
DNA-templated transcription is the method of transcription. Amoeba serve as the natural host.

Genomics
A promoter sequence—AAATATTT—has been found associated with 55% of the identified genes in this virus.  Most of these sequences occur in multiple copies.

History
One of the first members of this family was described in 2009. Other members described around then (2007) and since then have been documented.

References

External links
 Viralzone: Marseilleviridae
 ICTV

 
Nucleocytoplasmic large DNA viruses
Virus families